The Steyr 120 Super, Steyr 125 Super and Steyr 220 were a series of medium-sized cars built by the Austrian firm Steyr-Daimler-Puch from 1935 to 1941. The moderately streamlined body was designed by technical director Karl Jenschke (1899-1969) and was manufactured by Gläser-Karosserie GmbH in Dresden. The design had a close resemblance to the smaller Steyr 100.

Steyr 120/125 Super

The 120 series cars were equipped with a six-cylinder in-line engine (as opposed to the four-cylinder Steyr 100) driving the rear wheels via a four-speed transmission. Front wheels had a transverse  leaf spring suspension while the rear swing axle was mounted on quarter-elliptic leaf springs. On the four-door sedan model the rear doors were hinged at the back-end (known as suicide doors), allowing the B-pillar to be omitted. By 1936 a total of 1200 Steyr 120 Super had been produced.

The model was sold as Steyr 125 Super, mainly in Germany. It was offered until 1937 and only 200 units were made.

Steyr 220

In 1937 the unaltered body was refitted with a still bigger engine and was named Steyr 220. It was available in four body styles (five-passenger limousine, five-passenger  cabriolet, and two cabriolet versions with bodies by Gläser Coachworks of Dresden, Germany). All models received inline six-cylinder engine and mated to a four-speed manual. Given the car's lightweight and rigid chassis with four-wheel independent suspension, its performance and handling would have been exceptional for the day. This popular model remained in production until 1941 with 5900 units built.

During the Second World War this model, especially in a cabriolet version was designed primarily for Nazi Germany's high rank commanders and officers. A Steyr 220, with the more powerful 2.3 litre engine was the car used in an escape from Auschwitz concentration camp on 20 June 1942. The car was owned by the camp commandant Rudolf Höss and was taken by the escapees (Kazimierz Piechowski, Stanisław Gustaw Jaster, Józef Lempart and Eugeniusz Bendera), who were dressed in SS uniforms and armed accordingly, and driven straight out of the main gates of the camp. The 4 escapees were never recaptured.

Steyr 220 Gläser Roadster

Though Steyr built a total of some 5,900 220 series models from 1937 to 1941, only about six of Gläser-bodied variant are known to have been constructed. The impact of the Art Deco Streamline Moderne movement on the car's styling is evident, especially in the flowing design of the front fenders and skirted rear fenders. Only two of the original six cars are known to survive to this day, which makes it a very rare specimen. One is in the United States, owned by a private collector (the other is exhibited at an Austrian museum). It has been honored at the Pebble Beach Concours d'Elegance and won the Best of Show at the Pinehurst Concours d'Elegance.

Interesting facts
 In 1920, famed designer Hans Ledwinka (most famous for the Tatra automobile) designed and built first Steyr, the Wafenauto. Later cars were built under the leadership of Ferdinand Porsche who joined the company in 1929 after working for Mercedes-Benz.
 The company was merged with Austro-Daimler-Puch in 1934. In total, Steyr manufactured 34,776 cars between 1920 and 1940. The 220 was the last pre-war model built by Steyr.
 Erdmann & Rossi produced and supplied various parts for Gläser-Karosserie car bodies.

Gallery

References

Oswald, Werner: Deutsche Autos 1920-1945, Motorbuch Verlag Stuttgart, 10. Auflage (1996),

External links

 Further information about Steyr 120, Steyr 125 and Steyr 220

Steyr-Puch vehicles
Rear-wheel-drive vehicles
1930s cars
Cars introduced in 1935